Maartje Looijen (born 16 November 1998) is a Dutch footballer who plays as a forward for ADO Den Haag in the Eredivisie.

Club career

International career

Personal life
Looijen was born in Leidschendam.

Honours

Club

International

References

Living people
Dutch women's footballers
Eredivisie (women) players
1998 births
Women's association football forwards
ADO Den Haag (women) players
People from Leidschendam
21st-century Dutch women